The Margaret Herrick Library, located in Beverly Hills, California, is the main repository of print, graphic and research materials of the Academy of Motion Picture Arts and Sciences (AMPAS). The library contains a digital repository and has historical materials that include those relating to the Oscars awards show.

Collection 
The library has in excess of 1,000 collections including original film scripts, movie production records, correspondence and other materials pertaining to movie studios, production companies, individuals, and professional organizations.

The library also collects and maintains oral histories of the industry.

History 
The original research library was created in 1928, a year after the founding of AMPAS. It is funded by the Academy Foundation, which is AMPAS' educational division. It one of the biggest film research libraries in the world, holding in excess of 32,000 books, 80,000 screenplays, and 300,000 files of clippings. Other materials at the library are 35,000 posters, 10 million photographs, copies of 2,400 periodicals, costume and production and costume sketches, sheet music and musical scores, and advertising materials, including press books and lobby cards. There are also artifacts such as Academy Award statuettes. The library is governed by the Academy's Board of Governors.

In 1947, Herrick was responsible for the first acquisition of an archival collection: the William Selig collection.

In 1953, Herrick worked to have the Oscars broadcast on television, which allowed the award ceremony and the library to become financially independent of the studios, upon which the show and library had been previously wholly reliant.

AMPAS' research library was renamed for Margaret Herrick, who served as AMPAS librarian from 1936 to 1943 before becoming executive director from 1945 to 1971, upon her retirement in 1971. Dedicated to AMPAS' mission of broadening the film industry's educational and cultural outreach, Herrick was responsible for establishing the library as a world-class research institution.

In its inception, the Academy library had offices in the Roosevelt Hotel. The library moved to its current building, a former waterworks, in Beverly Hills in 1991.

See also 
 Margaret Herrick
 Academy of Motion Picture Arts and Sciences

References

Further reading 
  (Originally presented as the author's Ph.D. thesis, University of Southern California, Arno Press Cinema Program, 1966.)

External links 

 
 Margaret Herrick Library Digital Collections

Buildings and structures in Beverly Hills, California
Libraries in Los Angeles County, California
Film archives in the United States
Academy of Motion Picture Arts and Sciences
Photo archives in the United States
Cinema of Southern California
Film organizations in the United States
Organizations established in 1928
1928 establishments in California